In information theory, an entropy coding (or entropy encoding) is any lossless data compression method that attempts to approach the lower bound declared by Shannon's source coding theorem, which states that any lossless data compression method must have expected code length greater or equal to the entropy of the source.

An entropy coding attempts to approach this lower bound.

Two of the most common entropy coding techniques are Huffman coding and arithmetic coding.
If the approximate entropy characteristics of a data stream are known in advance (especially for signal compression), a simpler static code may be useful.
These static codes include universal codes (such as Elias gamma coding or Fibonacci coding) and Golomb codes (such as unary coding or Rice coding).

Since 2014, data compressors have started using the asymmetric numeral systems family of entropy coding techniques, which allows combination of the compression ratio of arithmetic coding with a processing cost similar to Huffman coding.

Entropy as a measure of similarity 

Besides using entropy coding as a way to compress digital data, an entropy encoder can also be used to measure the amount of similarity between streams of data and already existing classes of data.  This is done by generating an entropy coder/compressor for each class of data; unknown data is then classified by feeding the uncompressed data to each compressor and seeing which compressor yields the highest compression.  The coder with the best compression is probably the coder trained on the data that was most similar to the unknown data.

See also 
 Arithmetic coding
 Asymmetric numeral systems (ANS)
 Context-adaptive binary arithmetic coding (CABAC)
 Huffman coding
 Range coding

References

External links 
 Information Theory, Inference, and Learning Algorithms, by David MacKay (2003), gives an introduction to Shannon theory and data compression, including the Huffman coding and arithmetic coding.
 Source Coding, by T. Wiegand and H. Schwarz (2011).

Lossless compression algorithms
Entropy and information